Olivier Claude C. Magne (born 11 April 1973 in Aurillac, Cantal) is a French former rugby union footballer and a current coach.

Magne was a rugby back row forward, known especially for his speed and handling in open field play. He represented  89 times, scoring 14 tries.

He joined his hometown team, Stade Aurillacois, as a boy in 1979. He later played for Brive and US Dax, before joining AS Montferrandaise for the 1999–2000 season.

He made his international test debut at the age of 23 on 15 February 1997 as a replacement against Wales during the 1997 Five Nations Championship. The game was won 27–22 and France went on to win the tournament with a Grand Slam. He played a starring role in the 1999 and 2003 Rugby World Cups, playing in all France’s matches in both tournaments. The highlight of his career was probably the 1999 Rugby World Cup final, where he ended on the losing side as France were beaten 35–12. He also played a barnstorming role in the 1999 semi-final defeat of the All Blacks. He is only one of two French forwards to have participated in four Grand Slam-winning teams.

He was a regular member of Bernard Laporte’s squads, playing in all France's matches in the 2004 Six Nations Championship. Magne played in the mid-year Tests against  and  but missed the November internationals through injury. His last international appearances were against the All Blacks during France's mid-year tour to New Zealand in June 2007. He was not selected in the French squad for the 2007 Rugby World Cup; he was placed on the reserve list but was not called upon.

In June 2005, Magne signed a two-year contract with London Irish. At the end of his contract, in 2007, he returned to France and took up a coaching position with his former club, CA Brive. On 1 June 2008 Magne declared that he won't be the coach for the next season.

On 9 November 2009 the Greek Rugby Federation announced that Magne would be taking over as the new coach of the Greece national team.

External links
London Irish profile
RBS 6 Nations profile
Magne takes over as Greece coach

1973 births
Living people
People from Aurillac
French rugby union players
London Irish players
Rugby union flankers
ASM Clermont Auvergne players
CA Brive players
France international rugby union players
Sportspeople from Cantal